An election to Cambridgeshire County Council took place on 5 May 2005 as part of the 2005 United Kingdom local elections. The election took place on the same day as the 2005 United Kingdom General Election. 69 councillors were elected from 60 electoral divisions, which returned either one or two county councillors each by first-past-the-post voting. New electoral division boundaries were brought in for this election, increasing the number of seats from the 59 seats at the 2001 Cambridgeshire County Council election. The Conservative Party retained their majority on the council, while the Labour Party lost all their rural councillors with their representation limited to the city of Cambridge.

Results

|}

Party strength by electoral division
The following maps show the percentage of the vote each party obtained by electoral division. A colour key for each map can be viewed by clicking on the image.

Results by electoral division

Cambridge (14 seats)

East Cambridgeshire (9 seats)

Fenland (11 seats)

Huntingdonshire (19 seats)

South Cambridgeshire (16 seats)

References

Cambridgeshire County Council elections
2005 English local elections
2000s in Cambridgeshire